Gigi Leung Wing-kei (Chinese: 梁詠琪, born 25 March 1976) is a Hong Kong singer and actress.

Early life
She was born at Tsan Yuk Hospital in Sai Ying Pun on 25 March 1976 and was given the name Leung Pik-chi for superstitious reasons; as a child, Leung suffered from frequent asthma attacks and it was believed a change of name would bring better health. At 176 cm, Leung earned the nickname of 'Tall Girl'. She has a twin brother named Keith Leung Wing-chun(Leung Wing-chun).

Gigi Leung attended Maryknoll Convent School. Later, she went to the Hong Kong Polytechnic University where she gained a diploma from the School of Design. It was during her study at university that she accepted a modelling assignment from the watch company City Chain and caught the attention of film director Lee Chi-ngai who cast her in her very first movie, Doctor Mack (1995). The success of the movie brought her a further role in Full Throttle (1995), shot while she was finishing her diploma. For her supporting role in the film, Leung received a nomination for Best Newcomer at the 1995 Hong Kong Film Awards.

Career
Her singing career began the following year with the debut album Love Myself (1996). Since then, she has sung both Cantonese and Mandarin songs. She is recognised not only as a Cantopop/Mandopop singer, but as a songwriter and lyricist as well, having written songs for both herself and other local singers. She has a contract with Warner Music Hong Kong, with more than a dozen albums to her name. She has performed in several full-scale live concerts including one entitled Funny Face in 2003.

In 2008 25 March she signed a contract with Big Artiste Management, a subsidiary of Mei Ah Entertainment.

Since 1995, Leung has starred in over 20 movies, most of which are dramas and comedies. She has worked opposite acting veterans such as Tony Leung Chiu-wai, Andy Lau, Daniel Chan, Stephen Chow and Jet Li. In 2003, she starred with Takeshi Kaneshiro in Warner Bros.' first-ever Chinese-language film Turn Left, Turn Right. Notably, at the Hong Kong Film Awards, Leung was nominated for Best Actress and Best Supporting Actress for roles in Tempting Heart (1999) and A War Named Desire (2000) respectively.

Primarily an actress on the silver screen, Leung briefly appeared in the TVB serial The Last Breakthrough (2004). She has also performed in a number of stage musicals including The Great Entertainer (2004). Other works include the Cantonese narration for the Japanese film Quill (2004).

Leung is also active in charity work. Apart from being the ambassador for different charities, she has helped to build 7 schools in Mainland China to help poor children. She is also the youngest-ever local (at age 27) to receive the "Ten Most Outstanding Youth Award" in Hong Kong .

Leung is popular not just in Hong Kong, but also in Mainland China and Southeast Asia.

Spokesperson
Outside of the entertainment business, Leung has acted as the Hong Kong spokesperson for Japanese cosmetics company FANCL since 1999. She is also an ambassador to both United Nations Children's Fund (UNICEF) and World Wide Fund for Nature (WWF) Hong Kong. Other charity ambassador titles include Honourably Ambassador of Yan Chai Hospital, Special Ambassador to the Yan Aiu Hospital, Ambassador of Breast Cancer Fund and Ambassador of Society for Abandoned Animals (SAA). She also held numerous other special titles to numerous organisations. She joined her friends, Charlie Yeung, Valen Hsu and Angelica Lee to form the "Hope Foundation," a non-profit organisation to help children in need.

Personal life
In July 2009, she was reported to be in a relationship with a furniture designer from France, known only as Sly. Neither Gigi nor Sly admitted their relationship, but it was reported the couple separated in early 2010.

On 3 October 2011, Leung married her Spanish boyfriend Sergio Crespo Gutes (former basketball player and executive with Nestle HK) on the island of Ibiza. On 28 February 2015, Leung gave birth to her first child, a daughter, Sofia Crespo Leung (祈淑菲).

Sina microblog incident
Gigi Leung's Sina microblog account has up to 470,000 followers, most of them her young fans. On 30 March 2010, she blogged about the plight of the jailed Zhao Lianhai, whose five-year-old son fell victim to poison milk and developed kidney stones. The father-turned-activist began to use various means to voice his grievances. After receiving a message from the website's administrator, Gigi Leung then deleted the relevant blog, which resulted in hundreds of supportive messages from her fans.

Filmography

Film

Television series

Musical

Discography

Studio albums

Extended plays

Compilation albums

Live albums

Soundtrack albums

Concerts
 Gigi Leung Good Time concert world tour Part 2 (梁詠琪好时辰世界巡回演唱會)（2017）
 Gigi Leung Good Time concert tour Part 1 (梁詠琪好时辰巡回演唱會)(2016)
 Gigi Leung One Night in Hong Kong (梁詠琪香港G夜演唱會)(2011)
 Gigi Leung One Night in Beijing (梁詠琪北京G夜演唱會) (2010)
 Wonder Woman Charity Concert (2007)
 Solo Concert In Shanghai, China(2007)
 Tall Girl Gigi Leung Funny Face Live Concert (2003)
 Live 903 (2002) 903 id club梁詠琪拉闊音樂會2002
 G For Girl Live (2002)
 Gigi Leung 903 Concert (2000) 加洲紅紅人館903梁詠琪狂熱份子音樂會

Awards and nominations

References

External links

Gigi Leung on HK cinemagic

1976 births
Living people
Alumni of the Hong Kong Polytechnic University
Cantopop singer-songwriters
20th-century Hong Kong women singers
Hong Kong film actresses
Hong Kong Mandopop singers
20th-century Hong Kong actresses
21st-century Hong Kong actresses
21st-century Hong Kong women singers
Hong Kong television actresses
Hong Kong twins
Hong Kong idols